Collaborative economy may refer to:
 Collaborative consumption
 Sharing economy